Pulchella is a diatom genus in the family Naviculaceae.

Species 
 the genus contains seven described species.
Pulchella baicalensis
Pulchella kriegeriana
Pulchella minutissima
Pulchella obsita
Pulchella schwabei
Pulchella sergejii
Pulchella skvortzowii

References

External links

Naviculales
Diatom genera